The Republic of Noli was an Italian maritime republic that was centred on the city of Noli, in Liguria, and existed from 1192 to 1797. The area is now in the province of Savona, Italy. To protect itself from possible attacks and invasions by Savona and Marquisate of Finale, Noli allied in 1202 with the Republic of Genoa in a sort of protectorate, in fact, documents of the time show that the relationship was equal and not one of submission. The alliance allowed the Republic of Noli to have such growing importance that in 1239, a diocese was established there by Pope Gregory IX.

History
Noli was founded in 1192. After 10 years of existence, the small maritime republic allied itself with the larger and more powerful neighbouring Genoese Republic, which gave Noli the status of a Genoese protectorate until its dissolution in 1797. Throughout its history Noli was ruled by a Podestà. It survived for 605 years before it was annexed by Napoleon in 1797.

Economy
Despite its small size, Noli's good shipyard and harbour allowed them to become a commercial power. They had good trade relations with Genoa, as they only had to pay one penny to be allowed to trade in Genoa, whereas the Spanish had to pay 60 pennies to be allowed to trade.

Military
Noli's efficient shipyard allowed them to become somewhat of a naval power, despite its small size. The alliance with Genoa afforded it much protection, especially as Genoa used Noli's port to shelter their ships.

It is known that during a conflict with Savona, Noli sacked the town of Spotorno, which was owned by them, in 1227.

Foreign relations
In 1202, Noli was threatened by the County of Savona. In response, Noli formed a confederation with the powerful Republic of Genoa. Noli kept this alliance until they were dissolved in 1797.

Flag
The flag of Noli was first created in the 13th century, with a white cross and a red background, the exact opposite of Genoa's flag. Many of the merchant ships of Noli chose to fly under the Genoese flag, as it commanded much more respect.

Religion
In 1239, the Pope appointed a bishop to Noli.

References

Sources

Links

Maritime republics